Gold Medal in Metal (Alive & Archive) is the first live DVD/CD released by Swedish heavy metal band Dream Evil. It includes a DVD featuring the band playing live at the Sticky Fingers in their hometown of Gothenburg on 25 November 2006, directed and produced by Patric Ullaeus. The audio includes an additional disc of rare tracks, some previously unreleased and some only available on Japanese albums, as well as three new studio tracks recorded in 2007.

This collection was released on 25 August 2008 via Century Media Records.

Track listing  

Gold Medal disc (100:45)

I. Live Maerd (Live Show)

II. Video Clips

 Fire! Battle! In Metal!
 Blind Evil
 The Book of Heavy Metal
 Children of the Night

III. Interview

 The band's beginning and the inspirations...
 The "album by album commentary"
 Why is there a difference between Dream Evil and other bands?
 The new line-up...
 The section where you can ask each other questions for all viewers
 The next goals for Dream Evil
 The famous last words...
 The encore...

Silver Medal disc - Alive (67:00)

CD Disc 1 (Audio live-album with same track listing as "Live Maerd" DVD section)

 United
 Blind Evil
 Fire! Battle! In Metal!
 In Flames You Burn
 Crusaders' Anthem
 Back from the Dead
 Higher on Fire
 The Prophecy
 Made of Metal
 Heavy Metal in the Night
 Let Me Out
 The Chosen Ones
 The Book of Heavy Metal
 Chasing the Dragon
 Children of the Night

Bronze Medal disc - Archive (60:53)

CD Disc 2

 Dominator - 3:23
 Fight for Metal - 3:52
 December 25th - 4:17
 Pain Patrol - 3:15
 Lady of Pleasure - 3:27
 Chapter 6 - 4:03
 Gold Medal in Metal - 3:12
 Point of No Return - 3:52
 The Enemy - 3:15
 Hero of Zeroes - 4:30
 Bringing the Metal Back - 3:43
 Betrayed - 4:02
 Evilized [unplugged] - 4:56
 Dragonheart - 3:36
 Take the World - 4:09
 Crusader's Anthem [demo] - 4:03
 Touring Is My Life [live] - 1:58

References

Dream Evil albums
2008 live albums
2008 video albums
Live video albums
Century Media Records live albums
Century Media Records video albums